Yi Si-ae's Rebellion was an armed rebellion in 1467 in Hamgil Province (later renamed Hamgyong Province) led by General Yi Si-ae, a member of Yangban landowners in Kilju, Hamgil Province, to rebel against the centralized policy of King Sejo.

Background
Hamgil Province was the home province of King Yi Seong-Gye, the founder of the Joseon Dynasty. Taejo established this area as his base of power, subjugating the Jurchen tribes and increasing his strength. During Sejong's era, the river area expanded up to the Tuman River, and the people of Samnam-ni, Gangwon moved to make Hamgildo a province. However, in a situation where they always had to face off against the Jurchen raids, it was necessary to make enormous human and material sacrifices to defend Hamgildo, which put a tremendous burden on the people of Hamgildo. After the founding of the Joseon Dynasty, to effectively rule and protect Hamgildo and give preference to the birthplace of the royal family, the local nobles were appointed as local officials and led from generation to generation.

However, after King Sejo came to power, he strengthened the centralization policy to gradually reduce the number of officials from the north and dispatched officials from the south to govern the province. Sejo also passed the Hopae System to regulate the movement of Joseon's subjects further. The nobles in the northern regions feared that they would lose control of the commoners, causing dissatisfaction among the northerners.
Yu Ja-gwang, who participated in the subjugation army at the time of Yi Si-ae's rebellion, understood that the reason the rebellion spread was that the officials dispatched to Hamgil-do were inexperienced with the region and abused the people. Moreover, officials sent from the central government harassed the people with projects such as fortifications. As a result of regional discrimination against Hamgil residents, the people protested against appointed officials from abroad and local councils (Hyangcheong) in Hamgil unified their forces against the central government.

Prelude
Yi Si-ae first served as Heungjin's military commander in 1458, deputy commander in 1461, and magistrate of Hoeryong City in 1463. Initially, since the province had some exceptional circumstances of geographical proximity to Jurchens from the north, the court-appointed local officials from among the well-known nobles to rule the region from generation to generation. However, Sejo strengthened the centralized system and reduced northern officials, which made Yi feel uneasy about his position.

Yi Si-ae, his younger brother Yi Si-hab and son-in-law Yi Myeong-Hyo took advantage of the opportunity on leave for Hamgil Province due to his mother's death and rallied disgruntled nobles and residents of the northern provinces to organize and agitate the public while retiring from office. He stirred public sentiment by spreading rumors that soldiers from Pyeongan and Hwanghae would also cross Seolhanryeong Pass and enter Hamgil.

However, the officials and nobles criticized the rumors by Yi Si-ae as nonsense so that they would not be deceived and sympathize with the rebellion.

On May 10, 1467, he attacked and killed Kang Hyo-mun, the Hamgil-do provincial army commander (byeongmajeoldosa,兵馬節度使). At the same time, he killed Magestrate Seong Jeong-Shin of Kilju, Judge Park Soon-dal of Kilju County, and Kim Ik-su of Puryong County, which helped Yi Si-ae win the support of the people of the northern provinces, starting the rebellion.

Rebellion
Yi Si-ae established his base in his home, Kilju County, and then led his rebel army with the Iksok Force (Iksokgun) as the vanguard to attack Bukcheong, and Hongwon counties, and Dancheon, Hamhung cities and murdered all the local officials dispatched from the central government, such as provincial governor Shin Myeon, and captured Yoon Ja-un claiming he received the King's command to execute them for treason. At that time, Hamgildo's people supported Yi Si-ae's rebellion, and when Yi Si-ae delivered a forged document to Hamhung saying that Shin Myeon was the son of Yeonguijeong Shin Suk-ju, who caused a rebellion, that he should be executed. At the same time, he sent his people to deliver Kang to General Han Myeong-hoe and falsely told him it was the will of King Sejo to have Kang Hyo-moon executed for conspiring with high officials such as Shin Suk-ju to commit treason. On the other hand, Yi Si-ae gathered power by propagating to the people of Hamgil that his rebellion was the cause of the execution of Kang Hyo-moon and others according to the will of King Sejo. In the early days of the rebellion, the people believed Yi's rumors and persuasion that Kang was a loyalist and that the army that came to subdue him was rather a traitor. He even requested to become governor of Hamgildo. Upon hearing the news, King Sejo, knowing that the court officials were not involved, detained them in the palace.

Yi Si-ae also set up a liaison with the central government, saying, "The military commander Kang Hyo-moon and others conspired with Han Myeong-hoe and Shin Suk-Ju of Han Seong bu and led Hamgil-do's army to Seoul and attempted to rebel. I want you to become the leader." Sejo was deceived by Yi and imprisoned Han Myeong-hoe and Shin Suk-Ju for a time. When he heard the news that Shin Myeon and Kang Hyo-Mun were executed, he made Prince Gwiseong commander of the subjugation army of 30,000 with Provincial Commander Yi Jun of Guseong City, Deputy Commander Jo Seok-mun, and Generals Kang Soon, Heo Jong, Kim Gyo, Eo Yuso, and Nam I to suppress the rebellion.

Early Actions
On May 15, 1467, the rebel forces expanded their influence to Hamgil and Pyeongan Province. The Yi Jun advanced to Chorwon County, and Prince Gwiseong arrived in Guseong City. Still, he barely moved to Hoeyang County because the rebels were too strong, especially the Iksok Force, which numbered 4,500, with 900 of them armed with chongtong as they had years of experience fending off Jurchen raids. King Sejo, in response, dispatched more reinforcements to the Subjugation Army and made the provincial governor Kang Soon as general-in-chief of the Northwestern Frontier District and gave him command of 3,000 troops from Pyeongan to Yeongheung County and Muncheon City. Sejo gave Commander Park Jung-Seon authority of over 1,000 from Hwanghae to Mucheon County and General Eo Yu-so control of over 1,000 police officers from the Capital City of Hanseong to help the army in Guseong County. Sejo also supplied the military with several gunpowder weapons.

The troops of Prince Gwiseong repulsed Yi Si-ae's forces in Anbyeon and advanced to Hoeyang through the Cheoryeong Pass. Meanwhile, King Sejo sent down various filial piety statements (Hyoyumun), setting the condition that would pardon the rebels if they surrendered even now. Still, the rebels killed the messenger who carried the notice. At the same time, he offered a bounty to those who arrested rebel leaders.

On June 1, Yi Si-ae left for Magok City with 200~500 soldiers, while Yi Si-Hap traveled to Hat'an Village in Hongwon County, but the Gapsa for Prince Gwiseong, Cha Un-hyuk captured him, but he managed to escape and regroup with the rebels. At that time, the insurgents rendezvoused in Hamhung while the government forces marched to Yeongheung County. Inspector Yoon Ja-woon escaped from Yi Si-ae's camp in Guseong County to regroup with the army, crossing Chaeryong County and entered Anbyeon in Kangwon County, and told Heo Jong-un to enter Yeongheung, and encircle the rebels. Heo Jong-un engaged Yi Si-ae and repulsed him from the County, establishing a bridgehead for the government army. King Sejo ended the filial piety policy, freeing high-ranking officials such as Shin Suk-Ju, and at the same time devised hard-line measures against the rebels. Bewildered by King Sejo's strict standards, Yi Si-ae retreated from Hamheung and moved its headquarters to Dabo Village in Bukcheong to use it as a base. With Yi Si-ae's retreat, the government forces of Guseong County occupied Hamhung on June 19, advanced to Hongwon, and took command of the entire army to build new barracks from Sinwon County to Hamgwanryeong Pass to the west. Kang Soon made Guseong County the spearhead of the attack on Bukcheong and had him build a camp at Yangryeong, Sangaeryeong, and Jonggaeryeong Passes. Accordingly, Kang Soon-Eun, along with Park Jung-seon, Heo Jong, and Eo Yu-so, crossed Jonggaeryeong Pass and encamped in front of Bukcheong.

Siege of Bukcheong

First Battle
On June 19, Yi Si-ae evacuated Bukcheong and split his army. While Yi Si-ae advanced north of Dancheon, recruiting various rebel groups and Jurchens, Yi Si-hap stationed about 20,000 soldiers in Yeoju-eul Village, near Bukcheong. He dispatched a group of 500 female rebels to attack the government forces from Gosaripo Village in Iseong County to Bukcheong Fortress. Kang Soon and his forces entered Bukcheong Fortress unaware that Yi Si-ae's army was not there, and Yi Si-hap's rebels surrounded them. At the end of the day, as suggested by Kim Gyo, Kang Soon installed palisades around the castle on the flat ground while building a trench inside the castle and dug a tunnel outside the castle to prepare for an enemy attack. On June 24, from 2 to 4 am, Yi Si-ae attacked but was stopped by Kang Soon's emplacements. As the day dawned, Yi Si-ae's army as they began to lose morale. Yi Si-ae sent a northern official to parlay with Kang Soon and offered to surrender. But Kang Soon reprimanded him, "If you are a soldier, go to the palace and surrender yourself." Yi Si-ae attacked Bukcheong ten times but could not break his defenses.

Second Battle
On July 14, Yi Si-ae ordered his son-in-law, Yi Myeong-Hyo, to gather the rebels from Hongwon, Bukcheong, Gapsan, and Samsu Counties and cross Tangguryeong Pass into Sinpyong County and Hamheung county. Government forces blocked routes and supply lines to Bukcheong, forcing the rebels north to cross Manryeong, east of Bukcheong, and reorganizing his army in two rebel camps. He waited for the government forces at Bukcheong to collapse. Meanwhile, the government forces retreated from Bukcheong to Hongwon, dividing the army into three military camps. Yi Si-ae took advantage of this opportunity to occupy Bukcheong and prepare for a long-term battle. In the meantime, the government officials tried to parlay conditions for Yi Si- ae's surrender, but Yi Si-ae refused and ended up going into a long-term battle.

On July 25, General Kang Soon secretly marched in the middle of the night, crossing the Sangaeryeong Pass, while General Eo Yuso snuck through Jonggaeryeong Pass into Bukcheong, and they attacked from both sides. Then at the same time, Prince Gwiseong and his army left Guseong County and proceeded to Pyeongpo County. Using a pincer movement, they defeated the rebel armies at Sangaeryeong Pass. The government forces rushed into Bukcheong and defeated the rebel army led by a rebel official and swordsman Yu Deuk-Ji. They absorbed their armies and increased their government forces to about 50,000. Upon hearing the news of their defeat, Yi Si-ae led the remaining 10,000 soldiers to Manryeong.

Battle of Manryeong Pass

Manryeong Pass at Riwon County faces the sea to the south and Mt. Taesan to the north, making it a strategic location for Yi Si-ae to battle government forces.

On July 31, Kang Soon's army arrived at Manryong first, then Eo Yu-so's army, and then Prince Gwiseong's Army. First, the soldiers led by Prince Gwiseong, Kang Soon, Park Jung-Seon, Lt. General Woo Jong, Heo Jong, and others moved to the middle peak on the south side of the main road. Eo Yuso was to the seashore and Dongryeong Pass, and Kim Gyo and others went under Mt. Buksan and surrounded and advanced from four sides toward Manryeong to attack Yi Si-ae simultaneously, exchanging fire with their gunpowder weapons and arrows. Yi Si-ae, with ties with the Jurchens, requested reinforcements. Still, the government forces defeated the rebels at Hongwon and Bukcheong counties, cutting them off.

At 3-5pm, Woo Jong charged the rebels and occupied the main peak of Manryeong forcing the rebels with 5,000 remaining to retreat to the middle peak. Yi Si-ae ordered about 2,000 Shield Corps (Paengbaedae) in three lines. At the same time, around 5-7 pm, Eo Yu-so ordered the bombardment of the middle peak using hwachas penetrating the left flank of Yi Si-ae's army. He dispatched Woo Jong to lead his camouflaged amphibious commandos to infiltrate a hole in the corner of the rear defensive line allowing the government forces to defeat the rebels and forcing Yi Si-ae to retreat at night.

Suppression
The next day, August 1, the government forces pursued the Yi Si-ae troops fleeing north to Iseong County, burning guesthouses and warehouses along the way. On August 8, Prince Gwiseong and the government forces crossed Maunryeong and advanced to Yeongjewon, while Yi Si-ae encamped in Dancheon and attempted resistance across Namdaecheon but retreated to Kilju.

On August 12, the government forces pursued Yi Si-ae, recaptured Dancheon, and crossed Macheonryong to Yeongdong. Yi Si-ae retreated to Kyongsong County to gather soldiers and Jurchens allies. When Yi Si-ae's nephew, Heo Yu-rye, hears that his father, Heo Seung-do, has been forcibly taken away by Yi Si-ae as part of Heo Jong's plan to defeat him. He rendezvoused with him in secret and persuaded Yi Si-ae's subordinates, Yi Ju, Yi Un-ro, and Hwang Saeng, to betray Yi Si-ae. They arrested Yi Si-ae and Yi Si-hap and handed them and the rebel leaders over to Nam I's subjugation forces.

Aftermath
Nam I's subjugation forces annihilated the rebel army, and the captured rebels were beheaded and killed by Jun Seong-gun in front of the subjugation army. Yi Si-ae was executed by a thousand cuts which ended the four-month rebellion, and the military carried his head to Hanseong. As the revolution subsided, it resulted in accelerating the reign of King Sejo. Due to the Yi Si-ae's Rebellion, Kilju was demoted to Gilseong County, and Hamgil-do was divided into two provinces, North Hamgyong and South Hamgyong, and abolished their local councils. King Sejo promoted Yi Jun, Nam I, Jo Seok-mun, Eo Yu-so, Heo Jong, Heo Yu-rye, and Yi Suk-gi and enumerated many other officials such as Kim Seo-Hyung.

Significance

Yi Si-ae protested against the regime of King Sejo but was unsuccessful. He united the local people's dissatisfaction with Sejo's establishment of a powerful system of government.

The Battle of Manryeong was the turning point in the rebellion where both sides engaged in the first massive fire combat in the Joseon Dynasty. Many different kinds of (gunpowder) weapons, including the shield walls for defending against chongtong, chongtong to destroy the shield walls, and hwacha for significant damage, could be seen in the battles during Yi Si-ae's Rebellion.

See also
 King Sejo
 Yi Si-ae

References

External links 
 Lee Si-ae 
 이시애의 난 
 

1467 in Asia
Rebellions in Korea